Viscount Somerset, of Cashell in the County of Tipperary, was a title in the Peerage of Ireland. It was created in 1626 for Sir Thomas Somerset, the second son of Edward Somerset, 4th Earl of Worcester, and the brother of Henry Somerset, 1st Marquess of Worcester. The title became extinct on his death in 1649.

Viscounts Somerset (1626) 
 Thomas Somerset, 1st Viscount Somerset (1579–1649)

See also
Duke of Beaufort

References

Extinct viscountcies in the Peerage of Ireland

Noble titles created in 1626